Selv om de er små (Even If They Are Little) is a Norwegian family film starring Lille Grethe. The film premiered on December 26, 1957.

Plot
Brit's mother and father are divorced. Brit lives with her mother in Oslo, but she feels strongly attracted to her father. She is no longer allowed to visit him because he has remarried to a cabaret singer. Her father is a composer, and her mother wants to keep her daughter away from this artistic environment. However, Brit wants to go to her father. During her summer vacation, she escapes from the children's camp. She hikes along a country road and gets a ride with a scrap dealer. He understands that something is troubling Brit and wants to help her. Brit leaves him, and she gets a ride from an engineer. After that, she trudges alone on a shortcut through the forest, experiences strange things, and finally reaches her father's somewhat remote cottage. Her father's new wife is not the kind of person that Brit's mother said she is. Brit's problems with adults become increasingly complex.

Cast

Odd Borg as Einar Helle, Brit's father
Liv Wilse as Rita Helle, Einar's new wife
Lille Grethe as Brit Helle, 10 years old
Bab Christensen as Haldis Helle, Brit's mother
Henki Kolstad as Tallaksen, a scrap dealer
Lars Nordrum as Bernt Friis 
Åsta Hjelm
Dan Fosse
Kari Sundby
Anne Borg as Turid Ås, a dancer
Rolf Just Nilsen

References

External links
 
 Selv om de er små at the National Library of Norway
 Selv om de er små at Filmfront

1957 films
Norwegian black-and-white films
Films directed by Nils Reinhardt Christensen